Faku County is a county of Liaoning Province, Northeast China, it is under the administration of the prefecture-level city of Shenyang, the capital of Liaoning,  north of downtown Shenyang. It lies on China National Highway 203. It borders Kangping County to the north, Shenbei New Area to the southeast, and Xinmin City to the southwest as well as the prefecture-level cities of Tieling to the east and Fuxin to the west.

Administrative divisions
There are eight towns, 11 townships, and one ethnic township within the county.

Climate

References

External links

County-level divisions of Liaoning